Gustavo Grondona (born 16 June 1968 in Buenos Aires) was an Argentine football midfielder and is currently the assistant manager of Colo Colo football club from Chile.

Gustavo Grondona is the son of Héctor Grodona, brother of  Julio Humberto Grondona. He made his playing debut in 1989 for the club founded by his father, Arsenal de Sarandí.

Unlike his father Gustavo managed to step up to play at the highest level, appearing in the Argentine Primera División for Independiente, Huracán and Deportivo Español in the 1990s.

In 1998, he joined Peruvian club Universitario de Deportes where he was part of three championship winning squads between 1998 and 2000. 

After a short spell with Sporting Cristal in 2001, he returned to Argentina to play out his career with Arsenal during their first ever season in the Argentine Primera.

Titles
Primera División Peruana 1998
Primera División Peruana 1999
Primera División Peruana 2000

External links
 Argentine Primera statistics
 Futbol Peruano profile

1968 births
Living people
Footballers from Buenos Aires
Argentine footballers
Arsenal de Sarandí footballers
Club Atlético Independiente footballers
Club Atlético Huracán footballers
Deportivo Español footballers
Club Universitario de Deportes footballers
Sporting Cristal footballers
Argentine Primera División players
Argentine expatriate footballers
Expatriate footballers in Peru

Association football midfielders